Cape Foulweather is a basalt outcropping  above the Pacific Ocean on the central coastline of the U.S. state of  Oregon - in Lincoln County, south of Depoe Bay.  The cape is notable as the first promontory on the northwest coast of New Albion (as the area was then known) to be sighted and named by Captain James Cook, while on his third voyage around the world.  His March 7, 1778 journal entry reads:

The cape can be viewed from Otter Crest State Scenic Viewpoint.

See also
 Whale Cove (Oregon)

References

Foulweather, Cape
Oregon Coast
Landforms of Lincoln County, Oregon